The Temple of the Sibyl (in Polish, Świątynia Sybilli) is a colonnaded round monopteral temple-like structure  at Puławy, Poland,  built at the turn of the 19th century as a museum by Izabela Czartoryska.

History
The "Temple of the Sibyl" at Puławy, also known as the Temple of Memory, opened in 1801.  The structure was modeled after the similar monopteral "Temple of Vesta" at Tivoli, Italy, the site of the Tiburtine Sibyl, which was well known throughout Europe in engravings.  The Puławy temple, designed by Polish architect Chrystian Piotr Aigner, memorialized Polish history and culture, and the glories and miseries of human life. Items kept in the Temple of the Sibyl included the Grunwald Swords and a large "Royal Casket" containing portraits and personal items of Poland's monarchs and queens.

During the November Uprising of 1830–31, the museum was closed.  Izabela Czartoryska's son Adam Jerzy Czartoryski evacuated surviving collections to Paris, France, where he housed them at the Hôtel Lambert. His son Władysław Czartoryski later reopened the museum in 1878 in Kraków, in Austrian Poland, as the Czartoryski Museum.

Prus
In 1884, the Temple of the Sibyl was used by the Polish writer Bolesław Prus as the setting for his micro-story, "Mold of the Earth."

The story's action takes place adjacent to the Temple, where there is a boulder overgrown with molds.  At a certain moment the boulder magically transforms into a globe.

In his one-and-a-half-page micro-story, Prus identifies human societies with molds that, over the ages, blindly and impassively contest the surface of the globe.  He thus provides a metaphor for the competitive struggle for existence that goes on among human communities.

In 1869, then-22-year-old Bolesław Prus had briefly studied at the Agricultural and Forestry Institute that had been established on the old Czartoryski estate at Puławy.  Earlier, he had spent several years of his early childhood in Puławy.

See also
"Mold of the Earth"
Pythia
Temple of Vesta, Tivoli
Tiburtine Sibyl
Royal Baths Park

Notes

References
 Christopher Kasparek, "Two Micro-Stories by Bolesław Prus," The Polish Review, 1995, no. 1, pp. 99–103.
 Edward Pieścikowski, Bolesław Prus, 2nd ed., Warsaw, Państwowe Wydawnictwo Naukowe, 1985, .
 Zygmunt Szweykowski, Twórczość Bolesława Prusa (The Art of Bolesław Prus), 2nd ed., Warsaw, Państwowy Instytut Wydawniczy, 1972.

Museums in Lublin Voivodeship
Buildings and structures in Puławy